Bohdan Tůma (born 6 September 1967) is a Czech actor and voice actor. He is one of the most famous actors in the dubbing industry of Czech Republic, being the main voice actor for Jack Black, Jim Carrey or Denzel Washington.

Biography 
Bohdan was born in Prague. While studying singing and acting at Prague Conservatory, he appeared in plays of many theaters, such as Theatre on the Balustrade. Eventually, he began his career of voice acting in 1991.

Filmography 
 Tankový prapor (1991) - Pvt. Bamza
 Burning Bush (2013) - Police officer
 Tiger Theory (2016) - Voice of parrot

Dubbing roles
Wesley Snipes
Demolition Man (Simon Phoenix)
Murder at 1600 (Detective Harlan Regis)
One Night Stand (Maximilian "Max" Carlyle)
U.S. Marshals (Mark J. Sheridan / Mark Warren / Mark Roberts)
Blade (Eric Brooks / Blade)
Rising Sun (Lt. Webster "Web" Smith)
Blade II (Eric Brooks / Blade)
Liberty Stands Still (Joe)
The Marksman (Painter)
Unstoppable (Dean Cage)
Blade: Trinity (Eric Brooks / Blade)
7 Seconds (Jack Tulliver)
The Detonator (Sonni Griffith)
The Contractor (James Jackson Dial)
Chaos (Jason York / Scott Curtis / Lorenz)
Zig Zag (David "Dave" Fletcher)
Jungle Fever (Flipper Purify)
Hard Luck (Lucky)
Coming 2 America (General Izzi)
Denzel Washington
Courage Under Fire (Lt. Colonel Nathaniel Serling)
The Siege (Anthony Hubbard)
John Q. (John Q. Archibald)
The Manchurian Candidate (Maj. Ben Marco)
Man on Fire (John W. Creasy)
Inside Man (Keith Frazier)
Out of Time (Matt Lee Whitlock)
Déjà Vu (Doug Carlin)
American Gangster (Frank Lucas)
The Taking of Pelham 123 (Walter Garber)
Malcolm X (Malcolm X)
The Book of Eli (Eli)
Safe House (Tobin Frost)
The Equalizer (Robert McCall)
The Magnificent Seven (Sam Chisolm)
Fences (Troy Maxson)
The Equalizer 2 (Robert McCall)
The Little Things (Joe "Deke" Deacon)
Jim Carrey
Batman Forever (Edward Nygma / Riddler)
Ace Ventura: Pet Detective (Ace Ventura)
The Mask (Stanley Ipkiss / The Mask)
Dumb and Dumber (Lloyd Christmas)
Ace Ventura: When Nature Calls (Ace Ventura)
The Truman Show (Truman Burbank)
Once Bitten (Mark Kendall)
Yes Man (Carl Allen)
Earth Girls Are Easy (Wiploc)
Mr. Popper's Penguins (Tom Popper)
Anchorman 2: The Legend Continues (Scott Reils)
Kidding (Jeff Piccirillo / Mr. Pickles)
Sonic the Hedgehog (Dr. Robotnik)
Sonic the Hedgehog 2 (Dr. Robotnik)
Dark Crimes (Tadek)
Kevin Bacon
Apollo 13 (Jack Swigert)
Tremors (Valentine "Val" McKee)
Cavedweller (Randall Pritchard)
Frost/Nixon (Jack Brennan)
X-Men: First Class (Sebastian Shaw)
Jayne Mansfield's Car (Carroll Caldwell)
Jack Black
The Holiday (Miles Dumont)
Jumanji: Welcome to the Jungle (Professor Sheldon "Shelly" Oberon)
The House with a Clock in Its Walls (Jonathan Barnavelt)
Jumanji: The Next Level (Professor Sheldon "Shelly" Oberon)
Will Smith
Men in Black II (James Darrel Edwards III/Agent J)
Bad Boys (Mike Lowrey)
I, Robot (Detective Del Spooner)
I Am Legend (Robert Neville)

Personal life 
He's married and has two daughters, Denisa and Veronika.

References

External links

Bohdan Tůma at the Czech-Slovak Film Database 

1967 births
20th-century Czech male actors
21st-century Czech male actors
Czech male film actors
Czech male stage actors
Czech male television actors
Czech male voice actors
Living people
Male actors from Prague